Bazar Deh-e Gol Bagh (also Romanized as Bāzār Deh-e Gol Bāgh; also known as Bāzār Deh) is a village in Divshal Rural District, in the Central District of Langarud County, Gilan Province, Iran. At the 2006 census, its population was 146, in 42 families.

References 

Populated places in Langarud County